Leucopogon muticus, commonly knwon as blunt beard-heath, is a species of flowering plant in the heath family Ericaceae and is endemic to eastern Australia. It is an erect, straggling shrub with egg-shaped leaves with the narrower end towards the base, and small numbers of white, tube-shaped flowers that are densely bearded inside.

Description
The leaves are flat with 3 to 5 parallel veins.

Taxonomy
Leucopogon muticus was first formally described in 1810 by Robert Brown in his Prodromus Florae Novae Hollandiae et Insulae Van Diemen. The specific epithet (muticus) means "blunt".

Distribution and habitat

References

muticus
Flora of Queensland
Flora of New South Wales
Plants described in 1810
Taxa named by Robert Brown (botanist, born 1773)